The Partido Cannabis por la Legalización y la Normalización (PCLYN) was formed at the end of 2003 in Valencia, Spain, although its first Congress was held in January 2004. At the beginning it was promoted by a Spanish association called Cannabis Culture Association (Asociación de la Cultura Cannábica also called La Barraca de María), the Cannabis internet cafe association,  A.I.C.C. (Asociación de Internautas Cannabis Café -Association of Cannabis Caffe Internauters), and the Federation of Cannabis Associations (F.A.C. Federación de Asociaciones Cannábicas - Federation of associations) among others.

In its early days the party suffered a split, with those belonging to the AICC resigning from the party in February 2004. Other members became dissatisfied with the leadership of the party and its internal electoral processes following the partys first general meeting in May 2003. The splits caused logistical problems for the party which also suffered external attacks such as a denial of service attack on their web host on 16 May 2004. Nonetheless, the party continued its activities, holding meetings with groups such as Republican Left (ERPV) or the Confederation of the Greens and with Rastafari members. Subsequently, the party was reformed and reorganised.

In October 2006, the original members of the party announced its reformation. They were led by the affiliated nº155 but it was not done until today.

Elections results of Cannabis Party in Spain 

 Municipal Elections of 25-05-2003 (Valencia): 4,176 votes.
 General Elections of 14-03-2004, by provinces:

- (Valladolid): 1,836 votes. Senate: 7,938 votes.

- (Alicante): 5,446 votes. Senate: 13,240 votes.

- (Valencia): 9,563 votes. Senate: 35,278 votes.

 European Elections of 13-06-2004: 53,767 votes (0.35%)

See also 

 Cannabis in Spain
 Cannabis political parties

External links
Ecological Party of Spain-RCN/NOK Representación Cannabica Navarra  

2003 in cannabis
2003 establishments in Spain
Cannabis in Spain
Cannabis political parties
Political parties established in 2003
Political parties in Spain